is the fourteenth single by Bump of Chicken, released on October 24, 2007. The title track is from the album Orbital Period. The single peaked at #2 on the Oricon Weekly Charts, behind , which was released on the same day. The B-side is a remix of "Glass no Blues" from the album Flame Vein.

Track listing
 (Fujiwara Motoo)
 (Fujiwara)
 (Hidden track)

Personnel
Fujiwara Motoo — Guitar, vocals
Masukawa Hiroaki — Guitar
Naoi Yoshifumi — Bass
Masu Hideo — Drums

Chart performance

References

External links
メーデー on the official Bump of Chicken website.

2007 singles
Bump of Chicken songs
2007 songs
Toy's Factory singles
Songs written by Motoo Fujiwara